Mine-Resistant Ambush Protected (MRAP) is a term for United States military light tactical vehicles produced as part of the MRAP program that are designed specifically to withstand improvised explosive device (IED) attacks and ambushes.  The United States Department of Defense MRAP program began in 2007 as a response to the increased threat of IEDs during the Iraq War. From 2007 until 2012, the MRAP program deployed more than 12,000 vehicles in the Iraq War and War in Afghanistan.

Production of the first round of MRAP vehicles officially ended in 2012, followed by the launch of the Oshkosh M-ATV vehicle. In 2015, Oshkosh Corporation was awarded a contract to build the Oshkosh L-ATV as the Joint Light Tactical Vehicle, a lighter mine-resistant vehicle to replace the Humvee in combat roles and supplement the M-ATV.

The MRAP's high center of gravity means it has a tendency to roll over easily. In one study, a majority of the accidents MRAPs were involved in saw the vehicles overturning.

History

Light armored vehicles designed specifically to resist land mines were first introduced in specialized vehicles in the 1970s by the Rhodesian Army, and further developed by South African manufacturers, starting in 1974 with the Hippo armored personnel carrier (APC). The first step in SADF was the Bosvark, a Unimog fitted with a shallow mine-deflecting tub on the chassis to protect the crew. Then came the first generation of purpose-built vehicles, the Hippo and various other light types  They were essentially armoured V-shaped hulls mounted on truck chassis. The next generation was represented by the Buffel,  a Unimog chassis with a mine-protected cab and a mine-protected crew compartment mounted on it. These early vehicles did the job, but chassis were overloaded and were not very agile off-road. The Casspir infantry mobility vehicle was developed for the South African Defence Force after 1980; this was the inspiration for the American MRAP program and the basis for some of the program's vehicles.

In 2004, the TSG/FPI Cougar was designed by a British-led U.S. team, to a U.S. Marine Corps requirement.  It became the springboard from which the MRAP program was launched. Because there are only two "armor quality" steel mills in the U.S., the Russian-owned Oregon Steel Mills and the International Steel Group (now part of the Indian firm ArcelorMittal), qualified to produce steel armor for the U.S. Department of Defense, it negotiated to ensure enough steel was available to keep pace with production.

MRAP program
The U.S. military's MRAP program was prompted by U.S. casualties from IEDs during the Iraq War.

A number of designs of vehicles from various vendors were deployed as part of the MRAP program. MRAP vehicles usually have "V"-shaped hulls to deflect explosive forces from land mines or IEDs below the vehicle, thereby protecting vehicle and passengers.

The following companies submitted designs:
 Armor Holdings (acquired by BAE Systems on 31 July 2007)
 BAE Systems
 Force Protection Inc (FPI)
 General Dynamics Land Systems (GDLS)
 General Purpose Vehicles (GPV)
 Navistar International Military Group (IMG)
 Oshkosh Truck
 Protected Vehicles Incorporated (PVI)
 Textron Marine & Land Systems

Vehicle categories 

The MRAP class is separated into three categories according to weights and sizes.

Category I (MRAP-MRUV) 

The Mine-Resistant Utility Vehicle (MRUV) is smaller and lighter, designed for urban operations. Category 1 MRAP vehicles ordered or in service:
 BAE Caiman 4x4 – 2,864 ordered.
 BAE OMC RG-31
 BAE RG-33 4x4
 Force Protection Cougar H 4x4 – 1,560 vehicles ordered.
 International MaxxPro – 7,474 vehicles ordered.
 Textron M1117 Guardian – Removed from competition. As of 18 May 2007, Textron had been notified by the USMC that they will not be receiving any additional orders as part of the MRAP program.
 Protected Vehicles Inc./Oshkosh Truck Alpha – Although 100 vehicles were initially ordered, Oshkosh was notified by the Marine Corps on 29 June 2007 that it would receive no further orders for the PVI Alpha due to "concern regarding overall vehicle survivability" and other fundamental design deficiencies of an automotive and ergonomic nature, adding that remediation "would require significant redesign".

Category II (MRAP-JERRV) 
The Joint Explosive Ordnance Disposal (EOD) Rapid Response Vehicle (JERRV) is designed for missions including convoy lead, troop transport, ambulance, explosive ordnance disposal and combat engineering.

Category II MRAP vehicles ordered or currently in service:
 Force Protection Cougar HE 6x6 – 950 vehicles ordered.
 BAE RG-33L 6x6
 GDLS RG-31E – 600 vehicles ordered.
 Thales Australia Bushmaster IMV – Has been removed from the competition as of 7 August 2007. According to a Thales press release, "The Thales Bushmaster vehicle offer for the US MRAP Phase 1 Program was not selected due to an evolving requirement, not due to a lack of marketing or lobbying effort... Thales and Oshkosh remain confident of future potential sales of Bushmaster under ongoing Phases of MRAP in the US."
 Protected Vehicles Inc Golan – 60 vehicles initially ordered; then, when the Golan was eliminated from the competition, all vehicles were discarded by the Marines.
 International MaxxPro XL – 16 vehicles ordered.
 BAE Caiman 6x6 – 16 vehicles ordered.

Category III 
Force Protection Buffalo MRV for mine- and IED-clearing functionality, with 6 seats.

Vehicle production

In 2004, the United States Marine Corps reported that no troops had died in more than 300 IED attacks on Cougar vehicles.  In 2007, Secretary of Defense Robert Gates decided to increase MRAP vehicle orders . On 8 May 2007, Gates announced that acquisition of MRAPs was the Department of Defense's highest priority for fiscal year 2007; $1.1 billion was earmarked for MRAP. A 2008 GAO report found that Marine combat planners had delayed "an urgent request in 2005 for 1,169 MRAPs", primarily because then-Commandant General Michael Hagee wanted to preserve funding for up-armoring Humvees, believing they were the quickest way to protect Marines from roadside bomb threats.

In late 2007, the Marine Corps planned to replace all Humvees in combat zones with MRAP vehicles, although that changed. As armored vehicles were considered an "urgent need" in Afghanistan, the MRAP program was primarily funded under an "emergency war budget".

Originally, Brig. General Michael Brogan was in charge of the Marine MRAP program; he was succeeded by Brig. General Frank Kelley, Commander, United States Marine Corps Systems Command. The Army MRAP program was managed by Kevin Fahey, U.S. Army Program Executive Officer for Combat Support & Combat Service Support.

2007
In 2007, the Pentagon ordered about 10,000 MRAPs at a cost of over $500,000 each, and planned to order more MRAPs.

Partial list of January–July 2007 orders under the MRAP program:
 On 30 January 2007, FPI received an order for two Cougar H and two Cougar HE vehicles for testing and evaluation by the USMC for the MRAP program.
 On 14 February 2007, the Marine Corps Systems Command placed a $67.4 million delivery order for 65 Category I Cougar H vehicles and 60 Category II Cougar HE vehicles, as well as a $55.4 million delivery order 15 Category I BAE RG-33 vehicles, and 75 Category II BAE RG-33L vehicles, built in York, Pennsylvania.
 On 24 April 2007, the Marine Corps Systems Command placed a $481.4 million order with Force Protection for 300 Category I Cougar H vehicles and 700 Category II Cougar HE vehicles.
 On 31 May 2007, the Marine Corps Systems Command ordered 1200 Category I International MaxxPros at a cost of $623 million.
 On 1 June 2007, FPI received an order for 14 Category III Buffalo vehicles from the Marine Corps Systems Command. The contract is worth an approximate $11.9 million and is scheduled for completion by spring 2008.
 On 19 June 2007, the Navy placed an order on behalf of the Marine Corps and Army for 395 Category I, 60 Category II Force Protection Cougars at a cost of $221 million, and for 16 Category II International MaxxPro XLs for the sum of $8 million.
 On 28 June 2007, amended 16 July 2007, BAE Systems received a $235.8 million order for 16 RG-33 Category I patrol vehicles, 239 RG-33L Category II vehicles, 170 RG-33 Category I variants for the United States Special Operations Command, out of their total allotment of 333 vehicles, and 16 RG-33L Category II Ambulance variants, which are the first vehicles in the competition specifically listed for the ambulance role.
 On 13 July 2007, Stewart & Stevenson (Armor Holdings) received an order for 1,154 Category I and 16 Category II MRAP vehicles from the Marine Corps Systems Command. The vehicles are for delivery by February 2008 and the order is worth $518.5 million.
 On 20 July 2007, IMG received an additional order for 755 I MaxxPro MRAP vehicles.
 On 6 August 2007, General Dynamics Land Systems Canada received an order for 600 MRAP Category II RG-31 vehicles. The contract is worth $338.7 million. Manufacturing done by the Demmer Corporation of Lansing, Michigan, in addition to BAE OMC of Benoni, South Africa. Deliveries completed by March 2008.
 On 10 August 2007, the Marine Corps Systems Command placed a $69.8m order with Force Protection for 25 Category 1 Cougar H vehicles and 100 Category II Cougar HE vehicles.
 On 18 October 2007, the Pentagon placed additional orders for one thousand Category I vehicles from IMG (worth $509 million), 533 Category I and 247 Category II vehicles from Force Protection (worth $377 million), and 399 standard Category II, 112 ambulance-configured Category II RG-33L vehicles (worth $278 million) from BAE Systems. BAE also received a separate $44 million order for 89 RG33 Mod 5 (Category I) vehicles, for the U.S. Special Operations Command. GDLS and Armor Holdings were informed that they would receive no further orders in the MRAP program.
 On 18 December 2007, the U.S. military ordered 1,500 Category I MaxxPros (worth $1.12 billion) from Navistar, 600 Category II vehicles ($645 million) from BAE, 668 Category II vehicles (worth $458 million) from Armor Holdings (though BAE), and 178 Category I and 180 Category II Cougars ($378 million)from Force Protection.

2008
 On 14 March 2008, the U.S. military ordered 1,024 Category II Caiman's from BAE (worth $481.8 million), 743 Category I MaxxPros from Navistar ($410.7 million), and special command vehicles and ambulances from BAE ($234 million).
 On 17 July 2007, the U.S. Marine Corps System Command ordered 773 RG31 Category I MRAPs ($552M) from General Dynamics Land Systems Canada for delivery by April 2009.
 On 19 June 2007 the U.S. Army ordered an additional 44 BAE RG-31 Mk 5 vehicles and an additional 369 M1117 ASVs.

MRAP Armor Weight Reduction Spiral (MAWRS) Program resulted in armor technologies 40 percent lighter, with technologies fielded on more than 10,000 MRAP vehicles.  The program was led by the Army Research Laboratory and MAWRS was fielded on MRAP vehicles in 2008.

Forecasting the need for better and lighter protection from Improvised Explosive Devices (IEDs), ARL developed aggressive weight reduction goals in MRAP vehicles and set out to demonstrate practical technology options by the end of FY08.

The program's combined technical approach was to exploit computing and terminal effects experimentation to scale known technologies for the defeat of lED threats, understand the most viable armor mechanisms for efficient penetrator defeat, and then introduce light-weight composites, new materials and enhanced ballistic mechanisms to reduce the add-on weight of final armor packages.

The ARL's MAWRS program was recognized by U.S. Army Materiel Command as the "Top Ten Great Inventions of 2008."

2009

Oshkosh Corp., Oshkosh, Wisconsin, was awarded a $1,064.46 million firm-fixed-priced delivery order under previously awarded firm-fixed-price contract W56HZV-09-D-0111 to exercise an option for 1,700 MRAP All Terrain Vehicles. A similar Army contract for 1,700 MRAP All-Terrain Vehicles was valued at a further $1,063.7 million. By 2009, the U.S. Department of Defense had spent $20 billion on the MRAP program. Total MRAP program expenditure with final deliveries was expected to be $48.5 billion (FY10-11).

Criticism 
The MRAP program has been criticized for its high, nearly $50 billion cost, the potential logistical difficulties due to high fuel consumption and varied designs, a greater disconnection between troops and the local population due to MRAPs' massive size and menacing appearance conflicting with current counter-insurgency (COIN) strategy, and unclear disposal. In 2007, it was unknown what the U.S. military would do with MRAPs following its withdrawal from Iraq, since they are expensive to transport and operate. MRAP funding has pulled money away from other tactical vehicle programs, most noticeably the Humvee replacement, the Joint Light Tactical Vehicle, which has been delayed by two years.

According to Army Times, troops openly wonder about the design of some MRAP versions. One question centers around the inwards-facing design of the rear seats, given that an outward-facing design would have allowed troops to fire their weapons through ports, which some versions even lacked. The height and steepness of the dropdown stairs at the rear of some versions was observed to make exiting the vehicle dangerous. Also, troops riding in the rear can easily hit their heads on the ceiling while bouncing around in rough terrain, thereby engendering the risk of serious brain and spinal injuries.
 
Earlier reports had stated that the MRAP had been well received, with US troops stating that they would rather be hit by an IED in an MRAP than in a Humvee.

Rollovers and electric shock 

A report dated 13 June 2008 by the 'Marine Corps Center for Lessons Learned' indicated concerns about MRAP vehicles rolling over in combat zones. The V-shaped hulls of the MRAP give it a higher center of gravity, and the weight of the MRAP can cause the badly built or poorly maintained roads in rural Iraq or Afghanistan to collapse. Of the 66 MRAP accidents between 7 November 2007 and 8 June 2008, almost 40 were due to rollovers caused by bad roads, weak bridges, or driver error. In many of the rollovers, troops were injured.  However, in two separate incidents, five soldiers were killed by rolling over into a canal, thereby becoming trapped underwater with no means of escape.  The report said 75% of all rollovers occurred in rural areas, often where roads had been built above grade with an adjacent ditch or canal. 
   
The report also raised concerns associated with MRAP vehicles snagging on low-hanging power lines in Iraq or its antennas getting close enough to create an electric arc, which may lead to the electrocution of the passengers. The person located in the gunner's hatch is at the highest risk.

Effectiveness 

The MRAP may not be sufficiently effective against Explosively Formed Penetrators (EFP), which use an explosive charge to propel a specially shaped metal plate at high velocity while simultaneously deforming it into an armor-piercing projectile. Use of EFPs in the Iraq war more than doubled in 2006, and as of 2007 was expected to continue to increase. In 2007, 11 percent of all roadside bomb fatalities were due to EFPs. In 2007, the Marines had estimated that the use of the MRAP could reduce casualties in Iraq due to IED attacks by as much as 80 percent.

The MRAP weakness was addressed by the next-generation MRAP II. As an interim solution, the military installed a variant of the Humvee's IED defeating Frag Kit 6 armor, which adds significant weight, as well as width to the already large and heavy vehicle. In July 2008, the U.S. military reported the number of EFP attacks had dropped by 70 percent.

It is unknown whether the gunner was killed by the explosion or by the vehicle when it rolled over after the blast. The vehicle's v-hull was not compromised. The crew compartment also appeared to be uncompromised, and the three other crew members inside the vehicle survived; one with a shattered left foot, a broken nose and several broken teeth; one with a fractured foot; and the third physically unharmed.

Although this was reported as the first MRAP combat death, later reports stated that three soldiers had been killed by IEDs in RG-31s and two by EFPs in Buffalos before this incident. On 6 May 2008, eight soldiers had been reported killed in the thousands of MRAPs in Iraq, according to the news service Knight Ridder. In June 2008, USA Today reported that roadside bomb attacks and fatalities were down almost 90% partially due to MRAPs. "They've taken hits, many, many hits that would have killed soldiers and Marines in unarmored Humvees", according to Adm. Michael Mullen, chairman of the Joint Chiefs of Staff.

Maj. General Rick Lynch, who commanded a division in Baghdad, told USA Today the 14-ton MRAPs have forced insurgents to build bigger, more sophisticated bombs to knock out the vehicles. Those bombs take more time and resources to build and set up, which gives U.S. forces a better chance of catching the insurgents in the act and stopping them. According to Marinetimes.com, the Taliban was also focusing their efforts away from anti-materiel IEDs and more toward smaller anti-personnel bombs that target soldiers on patrol. In 2014, the US acknowledged that Islamic State of Iraq and the Levant was operating an advanced armored personnel carrier captured in Iraq.

The MRAP program is similar to the United States Army's Medium Mine Protected Vehicle program.

Logistics 

The MRAP program's lack of a common design presents a potential wartime logistic challenge, but others saw the diversity of MRAP vehicles as an advantage. The vehicle's weight and size severely limits its mobility off main roads, in urban areas, and over bridges, as 72 percent of the world's bridges cannot hold the MRAP. Its heft restricts transport by C-130 cargo aircraft or amphibious ships. Three MRAP vehicles (or five Oshkosh M-ATVs) fit in a C-17 aircraft, and airlifting is expensive, at $150,000 per vehicle, according to estimates by the U.S. Transportation Command.

The US Air Force contracted several Ukrainian Antonov An-124 heavy-cargo aircraft, which became a familiar sight above cities such as Charleston, South Carolina, where some MRAPs are produced. For comparison, sealifting costs around $13,000 per vehicle, but takes 3–4 weeks for the vehicle to arrive in theater. In December 2007, the Marine Corps reduced its request from 3,700 vehicles to 2,300. and the Army also reassessed its MRAP requirements in Iraq. In January 2010, 400 were flown into Afghanistan, increasing to 500 a month in February, but the goal of 1,000 a month was scaled back, because of difficulties in distribution and training drivers.

Models

MRAP II 

On 31 July 2007, the Marine Corps Systems Command launched an MRAP II pre-solicitation, to develop a new vehicle that offers a higher level of protection than the current MRAP vehicles, particularly from threats such as explosively formed penetrators. While the Frag Kit 6 was designed to meet the threat of EFPs, the MRAP II competition's purpose was to find a vehicle that did not need the upgrade kit. The U.S. Army Research Laboratory worked to ensure the technologies used in Frag Kit 6 would be available to MRAP II designers. The 2007 solicitation asked to give the Joint Program Management Office greater flexibility.

Initial testing at Aberdeen Proving Grounds disqualified vehicles that didn't meet requirements. Competitors who were rejected included Force Dynamics (reinforced Cougar), GDLS Canada (upgraded BAE OMC RG-31), Navistar subsidiary IMG (upgraded MaxxPro), Textron's upgraded M1117, and Protected Vehicles, Inc's upgraded Golan vehicle, with improved side doors and different armor. Blackwater USA (Grizzly APC with Ares EXO Scale appliqué armor) was later disqualified due to a limited amount of armor in the frontal area of the vehicle.

The two qualified designs were an upgraded Caiman, originally designed by Armor Holdings which was later acquired by BAE Systems, and the Bull, a combined effort between Ideal Innovations Inc, Ceradyne and Oshkosh. Both of the designs weighed 40,000 lb or more.

According to the Army Times in August 2007, the Pentagon had already decided to buy first-generation 14- to 24-ton MRAP I vehicles with extra Frag Kit 6-derived armor, not the 30-ton MRAP II vehicles, when placing its final MRAP orders at the end of summer, after a field commander's report. The paper also reported that, in addition, the Pentagon may buy some shorter, lighter MRAPs in their final batch. A senior Pentagon official told them that "the roads are caving in" under the weight of MRAPs and "We want it to weigh less than it weighs now".

Survivable Combat Tactical Vehicle
In 2010 Textron presented the Survivable Combat Tactical Vehicle (SCTV), a protective capsule that can increase Humvee survivability to MRAP levels while significantly improving mobility; the modifications come in five kits, but all five need to be installed before the vehicle can be properly called an SCTV. The vehicle features a monocoque V-shaped hull and angled sides to help deflect rocket-propelled grenades (RPGs) with scalable levels of protection. It has greater engine power, replacing the 6.5 liter diesel engine with a Cummins 6.7 liter diesel and Allison 6-speed transmission, as well as a stronger suspension, improved brakes, higher ground clearance, and many other modifications. The U.S. military have however preferred the Joint Light Tactical Vehicle.

Joint Light Tactical Vehicle

Vehicles built as part of the MRAP program are often criticized for their bulk, which limits their ability to maneuver.  The Joint Light Tactical Vehicle is designed to provide the same protection as an MRAP vehicle with lower weight and greater maneuverability.

In 2015, Oshkosh was awarded a contract to produce up to 49,100 vehicles for the US Army and Marine Corps based on its successful MRAP All terrain vehicle design.

Post-war applications
With the end of the Iraq War and the War in Afghanistan, there was some question as to what to do with MRAPs, as they were designed specifically for asymmetric warfare. The Army decided they would keep them in some sort of service post-war. Of the approximately 20,000 MRAPs in service, 30 percent (6,000) will stay in brigade combat teams as troop transports and route clearance vehicles, 10 percent (2,000) will be used for training, and 60 percent (12,000) will go into storage. MRAPs are to be superseded by the Joint Light Tactical Vehicle when it enters service in 2016. It still may be used until 2022, when the JLTV is in use in sufficient numbers.

On 1 October 2012, the Pentagon officially closed the MRAP production line. As of that date, 27,740 MRAP vehicles of all types had rolled off the assembly lines of seven manufacturers, and 12,726 vehicles were still in the Afghanistan theater of operations, about 870 were sold to foreign militaries, with 700 on foreign order.

In early July 2012, five MRAP vehicles were delivered to the 2nd Infantry Division in the Korean Peninsula. The 2ID tested over 50 vehicles to see how they would be used by American troops in the region and if their capabilities were right for Korea to protect against mines buried along the Korean Demilitarized Zone. In addition to force protection, the MRAPs provided a platform for "mission command-on-the-move" to give commanders communications and command-and-control capabilities while moving across the battlefield. Most, if not all, of the MRAPs delivered in Korea were deployed to Iraq or Afghanistan and were refurbished in the U.S. Previous combat experiences would determine how to best use the vehicles in South Korea. Integration into 2ID formations was to take less than a year, with positioning on the front line the following year.

U.S. military officials said the MRAPs were brought in to determine whether they would enhance their ability "to preserve peace and deter aggression on the Korean peninsula." North Korean military officials claimed they would be used to safely cross the DMZ to mount an all-out attack on the North, and said the forward deployment of such military hardware disturbed peace and stability in the region. However, by August 2013, the 2ID had decided not to utilize the over 80 MRAPs on the peninsula. They determined the vehicles were "not suitable for maneuver battalions to use" and that there are no plans to add MRAPs to their fleet in the foreseeable future. The vehicles were returned to the Army fleet management system for use in more suitable regions.

In 2013 the U.S. government was looking to sell about 2,000 out of the 11,000 MRAPs it has in Afghanistan. The logistical and financial task of bringing all the vehicles back to the U.S., or destroying some in-country, is too great and foreign buyers are sought to take them. Several countries have reportedly shown interest, but none have signed agreements. The cost of buying them would include shipping them out of Afghanistan themselves.

If the MRAPs cannot be sold to allies, U.S. forces will have to resort to destroying the vehicles before they leave the country. The quantities of MRAPs have been ruled as "in excess" of the needs of the U.S. military and would cost $50,000 per vehicle to ship them out of the country, and they won't be given to the Afghan National Security Forces because they can't maintain them or operate their electronic systems. The cost of destroying them would be $10,000 per vehicle.

In September 2014, the U.S. approved a $2.5 billion deal with the United Arab Emirates Army for over 4,500 surplus U.S. MRAPs for increased force protection, conducting humanitarian assistance operations, and protecting vital international commercial trade routes and critical infrastructure.  1,150 vehicles were Caimans.

US Government approved transferring 930 MRAP vehicles to Egypt using the Excess Defense Articles Grant Program. The MRAP vehicles were given for free and Egypt had to pay shipment from Sierra Army Depot in California to Egypt and refurbishment.

Pakistan also requested MRAPs through the Excess Defense Articles program. It was offered to buy them and transport from Afghanistan to Pakistan. However US government rejected the offer. Pakistan had to buy 200 brand new MRAPs.

The Defense Department is expected to send 250 MRAPs to Iraq to bolster the Iraqi National Security Forces against Islamic State militants. Iraqi forces were equipped with MRAPs after the U.S. withdrawal in 2011, but many were captured by ISIL during the June 2014 Northern Iraq offensive, and subsequently destroyed later by American air strikes. The vehicles will likely be transferred, rather than sold, as excess defense articles and be drawn from the U.S. stock of 1,500 MRAPs stored in Kuwait. Of the 250 vehicles, 225 will go to Iraqi Security Forces, while 25 will be given to Kurdish Peshmerga forces.

In 2015 around 20 MRAPs were donated to the African Union mission in Somalia. Uzbekistan received 308 MRAP vehicles.

NATO allied countries also acquired surplus MRAPs. Polish Special Forces received 45 M-ATV vehicles. Croatia received 212 Oshkosh M-ATV. These vehicles were transferred within the framework of the Excess Defense Articles programme.

In 2022, the U.S. government sent 40 MaxxPro MRAP vehicles to Ukraine as part of a package of military aid under Presidential Drawdown Authority. On October 4, 2022 the U.S. approved the provision of a further 200 MaxxPro MRAPs to Ukraine.

Post-war reductions 
As of September 2013, the U.S. Marine Corps had 3,700–3,800 MRAP vehicles and planned to reduce their inventory to 1,200–1,300 due to sequestration budget cuts, but then increased that number to 2,500 vehicles in May 2014.

In 2013, the U.S. government planned to keep about 5,600 of 8700 M-ATVs, with some 250 vehicles for U.S. Special Operations Command. From 2007 to 2011, the Army bought about 9,000 Navistar MaxxPro vehicles and planned to keep only about 3,000.

Following the drawdown from Afghanistan by the end of 2014, the U.S. Army will reduce its total MRAP fleet to 8,000 vehicles. The Army plans to divest 7,456 vehicles and retain 8,585. Of the total number of vehicles the Army is to keep, 5,036 are to be put in storage, 1,073 used for training and the remainder spread across the active force. The M-ATV will be kept the most at 5,681 vehicles, as it is smaller and lighter than other MRAPs for off-road mobility. The other most retained vehicle will be the MaxxPro Dash with 2,633 vehicles and 301 Maxxpro ambulances; other MRAPs such as the Cougar, Caiman, and larger MaxxPros will be disposed. They estimated in 2014 "it will need to spend $1.7 billion in supplemental wartime dollars over the next several years to modernize and retain 8,585 mine-resistant, ambush-protected vehicles, while divesting itself of another 7,456 MRAPs it no longer needs."

On 12 May 2016 the first shipment of MRAP vehicles from the United States arrived in the port of Alexandria for delivery to the Egyptian military. The delivery is the first batch of a total of 762 MRAP vehicles that the U.S. is transferring to Egypt. This new capability will be used to combat terrorism and promote stability in the region.  The equipment is being provided under the US Department of Defense's Excess Defense Articles grant program.

Law enforcement use 

The United States Department of Homeland Security Rapid Response Teams used MRAPs to assist people affected by hurricanes in 2012, and to pull destroyed government vehicles onto the street so they could be towed. The Federal Bureau of Investigation used an MRAP-type vehicle in a child kidnapping case in Midland, Alabama, in 2013.

The Department of Defense's Defense Logistics Agency is tasked with off-loading 13,000 MRAPs to 780 domestic law enforcement agencies on waiting lists for vehicles. The DLA does not transfer property to the agencies, so the vehicles are allocated to the agencies with costs picked up by them or the state, while the vehicles remain the property of the Defense Department. To receive an armored vehicle, a requesting agency has to meet certain criteria, including justification for use (such as for shooting incidents, SWAT operations and drug interdiction), geographical area and multi-jurisdiction use, the ability to pay for repairs and maintenance, and security and restricted access to the vehicle.

Law enforcement agencies in the U.S. can acquire MRAP vehicles through the Law Enforcement Support Office, which redistributes no longer needed military equipment to state and municipal agencies. Some police departments have acquired surplus MRAPs with no transfer costs or fees. Domestic agencies plan to use them in disaster relief roles, as they can go through flooded areas unlike normal police armored vehicles, and provide security in response to terrorist threats. Some MRAPs used by police forces have the turret removed and are repainted black.

The use of MRAPs by law enforcement is controversial and is a major factor of militarization of police. The American Civil Liberties Union has voiced concerns about militarization of police and argues that the military hardware could escalate violent situations. Many MRAPs have been obtained by small police forces that handle very few incidents that would necessitate their use. Though the MRAPs are obtained for free, the drawbacks are weight (as much as 18 tons), low fuel efficiency, and expensive refitting for law enforcement use, with a closed turret, new seating, loudspeakers, and emergency lights can cost around $70,000. Proponents of police MRAPs argue the lack of major incidents in certain areas does not mean they will never happen, that the protective armor on MRAPs prevent officer casualties that would be sustained in a regular police vehicle, and that MRAPs in police use only fulfill the same role as standard Lenco BearCat armored vehicles and nothing more.

NASA usage
NASA maintains multiple MRAPs for emergency evacuations of Orion spacecraft on launch pads.

References

External links 

Associated Press article about MRAPs in Iraq (9 May 2008)

 Global Security
 The heavyweights take on ballistics
 Billions Needed for New Armored Trucks
 Blast Resistant vs Armored
 MRAP - on Defense Update.com
 International Trucks/Plasan Sasa MRAP
 Pentagon balked at pleas from officers in field for safer vehicles (USA Today 7-16-07)
 Troops receive their first MaxxPro MRAPs in Iraq (video)
 Study Faults Delay of Armored Trucks for Iraq
 Austrian Armored MRAP design.

Wheeled armoured fighting vehicles
Wheeled armoured personnel carriers
Military engineering vehicles
Military vehicles introduced in the 2000s